Fattakhov (Tatar: Фәттахов, Russian: Фаттахов) is a Tatar masculine surname, its feminine counterpart is Fattakhova. It may refer to
Dmitri Fattakhov (born 1996), Russian football player 
Ilgiz Fattakhov (born 1986), Russian football player
Vasilya Fattakhova (1979–2016), Tatar singer

Tatar-language surnames